Chiroxiphia is one of several genera of manakins, small song birds of South and Central America.

The male plumage is a striking combination of black and bright blue. The crown is red, except in the yellow-crowned C. pareola regina. Females are comparably dull olive-greenish overall. Juveniles of both sexes resemble the adult female. As the male plumage takes several years to complete, individuals showing a level of intermediacy between full adult male and female-like juveniles are commonly seen (in particular female-plumaged birds with red, or yellow in C. pareola regina, crowns).

Manakins of the genus Chiroxiphia have an unusual mating system, based on female mate choice. In order to mate successfully, males have to form partnerships with another male.  The two males co-operate in an elaborate courtship dance, and sing a joint song (called a duet) at one of many traditionally fixed mating sites; the area where mating takes place can be described as an exploded lek. In some species such as the blue manakin, these partnerships typically consist of three males. Females attend a number of these courtship sites, observing the male displays and eventually allow a male at one of the sites to mate.

The males can typically be designated alpha and beta, since there is a clear dominance relationship between them. There is only ever one alpha male, but, depending on species, there may be one or two beta males. Beta males are sometimes sub-adults - easily recognized, as their plumage retain female-like characters. Only the alpha male is ever seen to mate with the female.

As in other manakins, males play no part in the care of the young.

Species

References
Trainer, J. M., McDonald, D. B., & Learn, W. A. (2002).  The development of coordinated singing in cooperatively displaying long-tailed manakins.  Behavioral Ecology, 13, 65–69.

 
Bird genera
Taxa named by Jean Cabanis